Bartholomew Freundlich (born January 17, 1970) is an American film director, television director, screenwriter, and film producer.

Early life
Freundlich was born and raised in Manhattan, the son of Debbie, a marketing consultant, and Larry Freundlich, a writer and publisher. Freundlich is Jewish on his father's side. He graduated with a double major in Cinema Studies and Film and Television Production from New York University's Tisch School of the Arts. His brother, Oliver Freundlich, is an architect.

Career
Before his first full-length film, The Myth of Fingerprints (which would receive awards at the Sundance Film Festival) in 1994, Freundlich had written and directed a short film titled A Dog Race in Alaska and a documentary titled Hired Hands.

Personal life
Freundlich has been in a relationship with actress Julianne Moore since 1996, when they met on the set of The Myth of Fingerprints (1997).

When casting Moore's character, Mia, Freundlich explains that he “was looking for someone who had a lot of complication, a lot of sadness under the surface, and portrayed very, very little of it in her face.” During filming, Freundlich recalls seeing Moore standing outside, exposed to the elements without a coat: "I came up to her and stood with my back to the wind. I didn’t want her to be cold, and I also didn’t want to put my arm around her, or smother her, because I didn’t know her that well...Even though I couldn’t have articulated it then, I understood that I could keep her warm up to a point. But then the rest was going to be for her to do. We connected in that moment on an unspoken level, where she knew I saw that flame in her, and understood it, and was willing not to suffocate it but to protect it.” 

Moore and Freundlich married on August 23, 2003. The couple have a son, Caleb (born December 4, 1997) and a daughter, Liv Helen (born April 11, 2002). Moore has appeared in all of Freundlich's feature films with the exception of Catch That Kid (2004), The Rebound (2009), and Wolves (2016).

Filmography
Short films
 A Dog Race in Alaska (1993)
 Hired Hands (1994)

Feature films
 The Myth of Fingerprints (1997)
 World Traveler (2001)
 Catch That Kid (2004)
 Trust the Man (2005)
 The Rebound (2009)
 Wolves (2016)
 After the Wedding (2019)
 With/In: Volume 1 (2021)

Television
 Californication (2007–2012, 8 episodes)
 Prime Suspect (2012, 1 episode)
 Mozart in the Jungle (2014, 2 episodes)
 Believe (2014, 1 episode)
 Little Voice (2020, 1 episode)

References

External links

1970 births
21st-century American writers
American film producers
Jewish American screenwriters
American male screenwriters
American television directors
Film directors from New York City
Living people
People from Greenwich Village
Tisch School of the Arts alumni
Television producers from New York City
Writers from Manhattan
Screenwriters from New York (state)